Alternative Faso (FA) is a liberal political party in Burkina Faso led by Ablassé Ouedraogo.

History
The party was established by Ouédraogo on 30 June 2011. It received 1.3% of the vote in the 2012 parliamentary elections, winning a single seat in the National Assembly.

References

External links
Party website

2011 establishments in Burkina Faso
Liberal parties in Africa
Political parties established in 2011
Political parties in Burkina Faso